Anja Liebert (born 19 September 1969) is a German politician. Liebert became a member of the Bundestag in the 2021 German federal election. She is affiliated with the Alliance 90/The Greens party.

References 

Living people
1969 births
Politicians from Dortmund
21st-century German politicians
21st-century German women politicians
Members of the Bundestag for Alliance 90/The Greens
Members of the Bundestag 2021–2025
Female members of the Bundestag